Paul Capdeville and Óscar Hernández were the defending champions. They were both present but did not compete together.
Capdeville partnered with Lucas Arnold Ker, but lost in the first round to José Acasuso and Sebastián Prieto.
Hernandez partnered with Sergio Roitman, but lost in the first round to Juan Pablo Brzezicki and Ross Hutchins.

José Acasuso and Sebastián Prieto won in the final 6–1, 3–0, after Máximo González and Juan Mónaco retired due to a left ankle injury for Monaco.

Seeds

Draw

Draw

External links
 Draw

Doubles